Szabolcs is an ancient Hungarian male name, probably of Hungarian or Hunnic origin. It is not known where the name derives from. The name is still very popular, its namesday is July 28.

Szabolcs was also the name of one of the leaders of the Magyars, the nephew of Árpád. He is also said to have been the second great leader of the Magyars. His power center was the now
unimportant village Szabolcs, where earthen ramparts from this age have been excavated. His people settled in the area known as Szabolcs county.

Some of the oldest attestations of the name are to be found in the founding charter of the Dömös abbey (A dömösi prépostság adománylevele) (1138/1329): sobolci and in Anonymus' Gesta Hungarorum: zobolchu (12th/13th century).

References
http://magyarnevek.hu/nevek/ferfinevek/Sz/Szabolcs
http://www.keresztnevek.hu/jelent%C3%A9se/SZABOLCS/

Magyar tribal chieftains